This is a list of butterfly species found in the Western Ghats region. This region is a biodiversity hotspot and about 334 species of butterflies have been recorded.

 Papilionidae—swallowtail butterflies (19 species)
 Pieridae—yellow-white butterflies (34 species)
 Nymphalidae—brush-footed butterflies (97 species)
 Riodinidae—metalmark butterflies (1 species)
 Lycaenidae—blues, hairstreaks and gossamer-winged butterflies (101 species) 
 Hesperiidae—skipper butterflies (83 species)

Family Papilionidae

Subfamily Papilioninae

Genus Graphium (Pathysa)—swordtails and zebras 

 Spot swordtail, Pathysa nomius (Esper, 1798)
 Fivebar swordtail, Pathysa antiphates  (Cramer, 1775)

Genus Graphium—bluebottles and jays 

 Common jay, Graphium doson (C. & R. Felder, 1864)
 Tailed jay, Graphium agamemnon (Linnaeus, 1758)
 Common bluebottle, Graphium sarpedon (Linnaeus, 1758)

Genus Atrophaneura (Pachliopta)—roses 

 Common rose, Pachliopta aristolochiae (Fabricius, 1775)
 Crimson rose, Pachliopta hector (Linnaeus, 1758)
 Malabar rose, Pachliopta pandiyana (Moore, 1881)

Genus Troides—birdwings 

 Southern birdwing, Troides minos (Cramer, 1779)

Genus Papilio (Chilasa)—mimes 

 Common mime, Papilio (Chilasa) clytia, Linnaeus, 1758

Genus Papilio (Papilio)—swallowtails 

 Malabar banded swallowtail, Papilio liomedon (Moore, 1874)
 Blue Mormon, Papilio polymnestor (Cramer, 1775)
 Red Helen, Papilio helenus ( Linnaeus, 1758)
 Common Mormon, Papilio polytes ( Linnaeus, 1758)
 Malabar raven, Papilio dravidarum (Wood-Mason, 1880)
 Lime butterfly, Papilio demoleus ( Linnaeus, 1758)
 Common banded peacock, Papilio crino (Fabricius, 1792)
 Malabar banded peacock, Papilio buddha (Westwood, 1872)
 Paris peacock, Papilio paris ( Linnaeus, 1758)

Family Pieridae

Subfamily Pierinae—whites

Genus Pieris—whites
Indian cabbage white, Pieris canidia  Linnaeus, 1768

Genus Anaphaeis—pioneers

 Pioneer (caper white), Anaphaeis aurota Fabricius, 1793

Genus Cepora—gulls
 Common gull, Cepora nerissa Fabricius, 1775
 Lesser gull, Cepora nadina Lucas, 1852

Genus Ixias—Indian orange tips

 White orange tip, Ixias marianne Cramer, 1779
 Yellow orange tip, Ixias pyrene  Linnaeus, 1764

Genus Delias—Jezebels

 Common Jezebel, Delias eucharis Drury, 1773

Genus Prioneris—sawtooths
 Painted sawtooth, Prioneris sita C. Felder, 1865

Genus Appias—puffins and albatrosses
 Spot puffin, Appias lalage (Doubleday, 1842)
 Plain puffin, Appias indra Moore, 1857
 Striped albatross, Appias libythea Fabricius, 1775
 Chocolate albatross, Appias lyncida Cramer, 1777
 Common albatross, Appias albina Felder
 Lesser albatross, Appias wardii (Moore, 1884)

Genus Leptosia—Psyche 
 Psyche, Leptosia nina Fabricius, 1793

Genus Hebomoia—great orange tip
 Great orange tip, Hebomoia glaucippe  Linnaeus, 1758

Genus Colotis—Arabs

 Small salmon Arab, Colotis amata Fabricius, 1775
 Blue-spotted Arab, Colotis phisadia (Godart, 1819)
 White Arab, Colotis vestalis (Butler, 1876)
 Large salmon Arab, Colotis fausta (Olivier, 1804)
 Small orange-tip, Colotis etrida Boisduval, 1836
 Plain orange-tip, Colotis aurora (Cramer, 1780)
 Crimson-tip, Colotis danae (Fabricius, 1775)

Genus Pareronia—wanderers
 Dark wanderer, Pareronia ceylanica (C. & R. Felder, 1865)
 Common wanderer, Pareronia valeria (Cramer, 1776)

Subfamily Coliadinae—yellows

Genus Catopsilia—emigrants
 Common emigrant, Catopsilia pomona Fabricius, 1775
 Mottled emigrant, Catopsilia pyranthe Latreille, 1758

Genus Eurema—grass yellows
 Small grass yellow, Eurema brigitta Cramer, 1780
 Spotless grass yellow, Eurema laeta Boisduval, 1836
 One-spot grass yellow, Eurema andersonii Moore
 Common grass yellow, Eurema hecabe  Linnaeus, 1758
 Three-spot grass yellow, Eurema blanda Boisduval, 1836
 Nilgiri grass yellow, Eurema nilgiriensis

Genus Colias—clouded yellows
 Nilgiri clouded yellow, Colias nilgiriensis

Family Nymphalidae

Subfamily Libytheinae

Genus Libythea—beaks
 Lobed beak, Libythea laius (Trimen, 1879)
 Club beak, Libythea myrrha, (Godart, 1819)

Subfamily Danainae

Genus Parantica—glassy tigers 
 Glassy tiger, Parantica aglea (Stoll, 1782)
 Nilgiri tiger, Parantica nilgiriensis (Moore, 1877)

Genus Tirumala—blue tigers
 Dark blue tiger, Tirumala septentrionis (Butler, 1874) 
 Blue tiger, Tirumala limniace Cramer, 1775

Genus Danaus—tigers
 Plain tiger, Danaus chrysippus  Linnaeus, 1758
 Common or striped tiger, Danaus genutia Cramer, 1779

Genus Euploea—crows

 Common Indian crow, Euploea core (Cramer, 1780)
 Double-branded crow, Euploea sylvester (Fabricius, 1793) 
 Blue king crow, Euploea klugii Moore, 1858

Genus Idea—tree nymphs
 Malabar tree nymph, Idea malabarica Moore, 1877

Subfamily Charaxinae

Genus Charaxes—rajahs
 Tawny rajah, Charaxes bernardus (Fabricius, 1793) 
 Black rajah, Charaxes solon (Fabricius, 1793)

Genus Polyura—nawabs

 Blue nawab, Polyura schreiberi (Godart, 1819)
 Common nawab, Polyura athamas (Drury, 1773)
 Anomalous common nawab, Polyura agraria

Subfamily Morphinae

Genus Discophora—duffers 
 Southern duffer, Discophora lepida (Moore, 1857)

Genus Amathusia—palmking 
 Palmking, Amathusia phidippus Linnaeus, 1763

Subfamily Satyrinae

Genus Mycalesis—bushbrowns 
 Whitebar bushbrown, Mycalesis anaxias Hewitson, 1862
 Small longbrand bushbrown, Mycalesis igilia Fruhstorfer, 1909
 Long-brand bushbrown, Mycalesis visala Moore, 1858
 Palebrand bushbrown, Mycalesis khasia Evans, 1920 
 Redeye bushbrown, Mycalesis adolphei (Guérin-Ménéville, 1843)
 Palni bushbrown, Mycalesis mamerata davisoni
 Red-disc bushbrown, Mycalesis oculus Marshall, 1880
 Gladeye bushbrown, Mycalesis patnia Moore, 1857
 Tamil bushbrown, Mycalesis subdita Moore
 Common bushbrown, Mycalesis perseus (Fabricius, 1775)
 Dark branded bushbrown, Mycalesis mineus (Linnaeus, 1758)

Genus Lethe—treebrowns 
 Common treebrown, Lethe rohria (Fabricius, 1787)
 Tamil treebrown, Lethe drypetis (Hewitson, ?1868)
 Bamboo treebrown, Lethe europa (Fabricius, 1775)

Genus Ypthima—rings 
 Common threering, Ypthima asterope
 Jewel fourring, Ypthima avanta Moore, 1875
 Common fivering, Ypthima baldus (Fabricius, 1775)
 White fourring, Ypthima ceylonica Hewitson, 1865
 Nilgiri fourring, Ypthima chenui (Guérin-Méneville, 1843)
 Common fourring, Ypthima huebneri Kirby, 1871
 Baby fivering, Ypthima philomela (Linnaeus, 1763)
 Palni fourring, Ypthima ypthimoides Moore, 1881

Genus Zipaetis—catseyes 
 Tamil catseye, Zipaetis saitis Hewitson, 1863

Genus Orsotriaena—nigger 
 Nigger, Orsotriaena medus (Fabricius, 1775)

Genus Melanitis—evening browns 
 Common evening brown, Melanitis leda (Linnaeus, 1758)
 Dark evening brown, Melanitis phedima (Cramer, 1780)
 Great evening brown, Melanitis zitenius (Herbst, 1796)

Genus Parantirrhoea—Travancore evening brown 
 Travancore evening brown, Parantirrhoea marshalli Wood-Mason, 1880

Genus Elymnias—palmflies 
 Common palmfly, Elymnias hypermnestra (Linnaeus, 1763)

Subfamily Heliconiinae

Genus Vindula—cruiser
 Cruiser, Vindula erota Fabricius, 1793

Genus Cirrochroa—yeomen
 Tamil yeoman, Cirrochroa thais (Fabricius, 1787)

Genus Cupha—rustic
 Rustic, Cupha erymanthis (Drury, 1773)

Genus Phalanta—leopards
 Small leopard, Phalanta alcippe Stoll, 1782
 Leopard, Phalanta phalantha Drury, 1773

Genus Argynnis—fritillaries 
 Indian fritillary, Argynnis hyperbius Linnaeus, 1763

Genus Cethosia—lacewings
 Tamil lacewing, Cethosia nietneri Felder & Felder, 1867

Subfamily Acraeinae

Genus Acraea—tawny coster

 Tawny coster, Acraea terpsicore (Linnaeus, 1758)

Subfamily Limenitidinae

Genus Limenitis—admirals
 Commander, Limenitis procris (Cramer, 1777)

Genus Athyma—sergeants 

 Common sergeant, Athyma perius (Linnaeus, 1758)
 Blackvein sergeant, Athyma ranga Moore, 1857
 Staff sergeant, Athyma selenophora (Kollar, 1844)
 Colour sergeant, Athyma nefte (Cramer, 1780)

Genus Pantoporia—lascars 
 Common lascar, Pantoporia hordonia (Stoll, 1790)
 Extra lascar, Pantoporia sandaka (Butler, 1892)

Genus Neptis—sailers

 Common sailer, Neptis hylas Linnaeus, 1758
 Shortbanded sailer, Neptis columella
 Chestnut-streaked sailer, Neptis jumbah Moore, 1857
 Yellowback sailer, Neptis viraja
 Sullied sailer, Neptis soma
 Clear sailer, Neptis nata
 Southern sullied sailer, Neptis clinia

Genus Parthenos—clipper
 Clipper, Parthenos sylvia (Cramer, 1775)

Genus Euthalia—barons
 Common baron, Euthalia aconthea (Cramer, 1777)
 Gaudy baron, Euthalia lubentina (Cramer, 1777)
 Baronet, Euthalia nais (Forster, 1771)
 Blue baron, Euthalia telchinia (Ménétriés, 1857)

Genus Tanaecia—counts
 Grey count, Tanaecia lepidea (Butler, 1868)

Genus Dophla—dukes
 Redspot duke, Dophla evelina (Stoll, 1790)

Subfamily Cyrestinae

Genus Cyrestis—map butterflies 
 Common map, Cyrestis thyodamas Boisduval, 1836

Subfamily Biblidinae

Genus Ariadne—castors
 Angled castor, Ariadne ariadne Linnaeus, 1763
 Common castor, Ariadne merione

Genus Byblia—joker
 Joker, Byblia ilithyia (Drury, 1773)

Subfamily Apaturinae

Genus Rohana
 Black prince, Rohana parisatis (Westwood, 1850)

Genus Euripus—courtesans 
 Painted courtesan, Euripus consimilis (Westwood, 1850)

Subfamily Nymphalinae

Genus Vanessa—admirals, painted lady
 Indian red admiral, Vanessa indica (Herbst, 1794)
 Painted lady, Vanessa cardui

Genus Kaniska 
 Blue admiral, Kaniska canace (Linnaeus, 1763)

Genus Junonia—pansies 
 Gray pansy, Junonia atlites (Linnaeus, 1763)
 Peacock pansy, Junonia almana (Linnaeus, 1758)
 Yellow pansy, Junonia hierta (Fabricius, 1798)
 Chocolate pansy, Junonia iphita (Cramer, 1779)
 Lemon pansy, Junonia lemonias (Linnaeus, 1758)
 Blue pansy, Junonia orithya (Linnaeus, 1758)

Genus Hypolimnas—eggflies
 Great eggfly, Hypolimnas bolina (Linnaeus, 1758)
 Danaid eggfly, Hypolimnas misippus (Linnaeus, 1764)

Genus Kallima—oakleafs
 Orange oakleaf, Kallima inachus (Boisduval, 1846)
 South Indian blue oakleaf, Kallima horsfieldii Kollar, 1844

Genus Doleschallia—autumn leaf
 Autumn leaf, Doleschallia bisaltide malabarica (Cramer, 1777)

Family Riodinidae

Subfamily Nemeobiinae

Genus Abisara—Judies
 Plum Judy, Abisara echerius (Moore, 1901)

Family Lycaenidae

Subfamily Curetinae

Genus Curetis—sunbeams
 Indian sunbeam, Curetis thetis (Drury, 1773) (L40.1)
 Shiva's sunbeam, Curetis siva Evans, 1954 
 Toothed sunbeam, Curetis dentata Moore, 1879

Subfamily Miletinae

Genus Logania—mottles
 Mottle, Logania distanti Semper, 1889.

Genus Spalgis—apefly
 Apefly, Spalgis epius (Westwood, 1851) (L6.1)

Subfamily Polyommatinae

Genus Talicada—red Pierrot
 Red Pierrot, Talicada nyseus Guérin, 1843. (L8.1)

Genus Castalius—common Pierrot
 Common Pierrot, Castalius rosimon Fabricius, 1775. (L9.1)
 Dark Pierrot, Castalius ananda de Nicéville, 1884 previously Tarucus ananda de Nicéville (L10.1)

Genus Caleta—angled Pierrot
 Angled Pierrot, Caleta caleta Hewitson, 1876 earlier Castalius caleta Moore (L9.2)

Genus Discolampa—banded blue Pierrot
 Banded blue Pierrot, Discolampa ethion Westwood, 1851 earlier Castalius ethion Doubleday & Hewitson (L9.3)

Genus Tarucus—blue Pierrots
 Spotted Pierrot, Tarucus callinara Butler, 1886 (L10.4)
 Striped Pierrot, Tarucus nara Kollar, 1848 (L10.9)
 Indian Pierrot, Tarucus indica Evans, 1932 
 Balkan Pierrot, Tarucus balkanicus (Freyer, 1845)

Genus Syntarucus—zebra blue
 Zebra blue, Syntarucus plinius (Fabricius, 1793) (L11.1) (synonyms Leptotus plinius, Tarucus plinius)

Genus Azanus—babul blues
 Bright babul blue, Azanus ubaldus Cramer, 1782 (L12.1)
 Dull babul blue, Azanus uranus Butler, 1886 (L12.2)
 African babul blue, Azanus jesous Guérin-Meneville, 1847 (L12.4)

Genus Neopithecops—Quaker
 Quaker, Neopithecops zalmora Butler 1870 (L15.1)

Genus Megisba—Malayan
 Malayan, Megisba malaya (Horsfield, 1828) (H20.1, p. 220)

Genus Celastrina—hedge blues
 Plain hedge blue, Celastrina lavendularis (Moore, 1877) previously Lycaenopsis lavendularis Moore (L19.15)

Genus Acytolepis—hedge blues
 Common hedge blue, Acytolepis puspa (Horsfield, 1828) previously Lycaenopsis puspa (Toxopeus) (L19.1)
 Hampson's hedge blue, Acytolepis lilacea (Hampson, 1889) previously Lycaenopsis lilacea Hampson (L19.2)

Genus Akasinula—white hedge blue
 White hedge blue, Akasinula akasa (Horsfield, 1828) previously Lycaenopsis akasa Frühstorfer (L19.10)

Genus Cyaniris—hedge blues
 Whitedisc hedge blue, Cyaniris albidisca Moore, 1883 previously Lycaenopsis albidisca Moore (L19.6)

Genus Polyommatus—meadow blues
 Singhalese hedge blue, Polyommatus singalensis Moore, 1877 previously Lycaenopsis singalensis Felder (L19.13)

Genus Chilades—lime blue
 Lime blue, Chilades lajus (Stoll, [1780]) (L21.1)
 Indian Cupid, Chilades parrhasius (Fabricius, 1793) previously Everes parrhasius Fabricius (L16.4)

Genus Luthrodes—Cupids
 Small Cupid, Luthrodes contracta (Butler, 1880) previously Euchrysops contracta Butler (L23.2)?
 Plains Cupid, Luthrodes pandava (Horsfield, 1829) previously Euchrysops pandava Horsfield (L23.3)

Genus Zizeeria—grass blues
 Dark grass blue, Zizeeria lysimon (Hübner, 1798–1803) (L22.3)
 Lesser grass blue, Zizeeria otis (Fabricius, 1787) (L22.5)

Genus Pseudozizeeria—pale grass blue
 Pale grass blue, Pseudozizeeria maha (Kollar, 1848) previously Zizeeria maha Kollar (L22.2)

Genus Zizula—tiny grass blue
 Tiny grass blue, Zizula gaika (Trimen, 1862) synonym Zizula hylax (Fabricius 1775) (now suppressed) (L22.4)

Genus Freyeria—grass jewel
 Grass jewel, Freyeria trochylus (Freyer, 1845) previously Zizeeria trochilus Freyer (L22.1)

Genus Euchrysops—gram blues
 Gram blue, Euchrysops cnejus (Fabricius, 1798) (L23.1)

Genus Anthene—ciliate blues
 Ciliate blue, Anthene emolus (Godart, 1823) previously Lycaenesthes emolus Godart (L24.1)
 Pointed ciliate blue, Anthene lycaenina (C. Felder, 1868) previously Lycaenesthes lycaenina Felder (L24.2)

Genus Catachrysops—forget-me-nots
 Forget-me-not, Catachrysops strabo (Fabricius, 1793) (L25.1)
 Silver forget-me-not, Catachrysops panoramus (C. Felder, 1860)

Genus Lampides—ceruleans and the peablue
 Peablue, Lampides boeticus (Linnaeus, 1767) (L26.1)

Genus Jamides—ceruleans
 Dark cerulean, Jamides bochus Stoll, 1782 (L27.1)
 Common cerulean, Jamides celeno (Cramer, 1775) (L27.3)
 Metallic cerulean, Jamides alecto (Felder, 1860) (L27.7)

Genus Nacaduba—lineblues
 Large four-line blue, Nacaduba pactolus (Felder, 1860) (L30.2)
 Pale four-line blue, Nacaduba hermus (Felder, 1860) (L30.3)
 Pointed lineblue, Nacaduba helicon Felder,? (L30.7)
 Transparent six-line blue, Nacaduba kurava (Moore, 1857) (L30.8)
 Opaque six-line blue, Nacaduba beroe (Felder & Felder, 1865) (L30.9)
 Rounded six-line blue, Nacaduba berenice (Herrich-Schäffer, 1869) (L30.10)
 Dark Ceylon six-line blue, Nacaduba calauria (C. Felder, 1860)

Genus Prosotas—lineblues
 Common Lineblue, Prosotas nora (Felder, 1860) previously Nacaduba nora Felder (L30.13)
 Tailless lineblue, Prosotas dubiosa (Semper, 1879) previously Nacaduba dubiosa Evans (L30.14)
 White-tipped lineblue, Prosotas noreia (Felder, 1868) previously Nacaduba noreia Felder (L30.15)

Genus Petrelea—dingy lineblue
 Dingy lineblue, Petrelea dana (De Nicéville, 1884) previously Nacaduba dana de Nicéville (L30.16)

Subfamily Theclinae

Genus Iraota—silverstreak blues
 Silverstreak blue, Iraota timoleon Stoll, 1790 (L41.1)

Genus Horsfieldia—leaf blue
 Leaf blue, Horsfieldia anita Moore

Genus Thaduka—many-tailed oak-blue
 Many-tailed oak-blue, Thaduka multicaudata Moore, 1878 (L43.1)

Genus Arhopala—oakblues
 Large oakblue, Arhopala amantes (Hewitson, 1862) previously Amblypodia amantes Hewitson (L45.18)
 Aberrant bushblue, Arhopala abseus (Hewitson, 1862) previously Amblypodia abseus (L45.39)
 Dark broken-band oakblue, Arhopala atrax (Hewitson, 1862)

Genus Nilasera—oakblues
 Centaur oakblue, Nilasera centaurus (Fabricius, 1775) previously Amblypodia centaurus Moore (L45.16)

Genus Panchala—oakblues
 Rosy oakblue, Panchala alea (Hewitson, 1862) previously Amblypodia alea Hewitson (L45.11)

Genus Narathura—Tamil oakblue
 Tamil oakblue, Narathura bazaloides (Hewitson, 1878) previously Amblypodia bazaloides Hewitson (L45.23)

Genus Surendra—acacia blue
 Common acacia blue, Surendra quercetorum (Moore, 1857) (L46.1)

Genus Zinaspa—silver streaked acacia blue
 Silver streaked acacia blue, Zinaspa todara (Moore, 1883) previously Surendra todara Moore (L46.2)

Genus Loxura—yamfly
 Yamfly, Loxura atymnus (Cramer, 1782) (L48.1)

Genus Zesius—redspot
 Redspot, Zesius chrysomallus Hübner, 1819/21 (L53.1)

Genus Pratapa—tufted royals
 White royal, Pratapa deva (Moore, 1857) (L54.5)

Genus Ancema—royals
 Silver royal, Ancema blanka (De Nicéville, 1895) previously Pratapa blanka Evans (L54.4)

Genus Creon—broadtail royal
 Broadtail royal, Creon cleobis (Godart, 1823) previously Pratapa cleobis Godart (L54.8)

Genus Tajuria—royals
 Plains blue royal, Tajuria jehana Moore, 1883 (L55.12)
 Peacock royal, Tajuria cippus (Fabricius, 1798) (L55.13)
 Spotted royal, Tajuria maculata Hewitson, ? (L55.17)

Genus Ops—branded royal
 Branded royal, Ops melastigma (De Nicéville, 1887) previously Tajuria melastigma de Nicéville (L55.4)

Genus Charana—mandarin blues
 Banded royal, Charana jalindra Moore (L56.1)

Genus Cheritra—common imperial
 Common imperial, Cheritra freja (Fabricius, 1793) (L60.1)

Genus Rathinda—monkeypuzzle
 Monkeypuzzle, Rathinda amor (Fabricius, 1775) (L63.1)

Genus Horaga—onyxs
 Common onyx, Horaga onyx (Moore, 1857) (L64.1)
 Brown onyx, Horaga viola Moore, 1882 (L64.4)

Genus Catapaecilma—common tinsel
 Common tinsel, Catapaecilma elegans Druce, 1873 (L64.1)

Genus Chliaria—tits
 Orchid tit, Chliaria othona (Hewitson, 1865) (L66.1)
 Nilgiri tit, Chliaria nilgirica (Moore, 1883) previously Hypolycaena nilgirica Moore (L67.1)

Genus Zeltus—fluffy tit
 Fluffy tit, Zeltus etolus (Fabricius, 1787) (L68.1)

Genus Deudorix—cornelians
 Cornelian, Deudorix epijarbas (Moore, 1857) (L70.1)

Genus Virachola—guava blues
 Common guava blue, Virachola isocrates (Fabricius, 1793) (L71.1)
 Large guava blue, Virachola perse (Hewitson, 1863) (L71.2)

Genus Rapala—flashes
 Indigo flash, Rapala varuna (Hewitson, 1863) (L72.7)
 Slate flash, Rapala schistacea (Moore, 1879) (L72.8)
 Common red flash, Rapala iarbus (Fabricius, 1787) previously Rapala jarbas Fabricius (L72.13)

Genus Vadebra—Malabar flash
 Malabar flash, Vadebra lankana (Moore, 1879) previously Rapala lankana Moore (L72.3)

Genus Bindahara—plane
 Plane, Bindahara phocides (Fabricius, 1793) (L74.1)

Subfamily Aphnaeinae

Genus Cigaritis—silverlines
 Tawny silverline, Cigaritis acamas (Klug, 1834) (L51.1)
 Common silverline, Cigaritis vulcanus (Fabricius, 1775) (L52.1)
 Long-banded silverline, Cigaritis lohita (Horsfield, [1829]) (L52.11)
 Plumbeous silverline, Cigaritis schistacea (Moore, [1881]) (L52.2)
 Abnormal silverline, Cigaritis abnormis (Moore, [1884]) (L52.4)
 Common shot silverline, Cigaritis ictis (Hewitson, [1865]) (L52.5)
 Scarce shot silverline, Cigaritis elima (Moore, 1877) (L52.6)
 Lilac silverline, Cigaritis lilacinus (Moore, 1884) (L51.2)

Family Hesperiidae

Subfamily Coeliadinae

Genus Badamia—brown awl
 Brown awl, Badamia exclamationis (Fabricius, 1775)

Genus Bibasis—orange tailed awl
 Pale green awlet, Bibasis gomata (Moore, 1865)
 Orange awlet, Bibasis jaina (Moore, 1865)
 Orangetail awl, Bibasis sena (Moore, 1865)

Genus Choaspes—awlkings
 Indian awlking, Choaspes benjaminii (Guérin-Meneville, 1843)

Genus Hasora—awls
 Common awl, Hasora badra (Moore, 1857)
 Common banded awl, Hasora chromus (Cramer, 1780)
 White banded awl, Hasora taminatus (Hübner, 1818)
 Plain banded awl, Hasora vitta (Butler, 1870)

Subfamily Hesperiinae

Genus Aeromachus—scrub hoppers
 Dingy scrub-hopper, Aeromachus dubius (Elwes & Edwards, 1897)
 Pygmy grass or scrub-hopper, Aeromachus pygmaeus (Fabricius, 1775)

Genus Ampittia—bush hoppers
 Bush hopper, Ampittia dioscorides (Fabricius, 1793)

Genus Arnetta—bobs
 Coorg forest hopper, Arnetta mercara (Evans, 1932)
 Vindhyan bob, Arnetta vindhiana (Moore, 1883)

Genus Baoris—swifts
 Paintbrush swift, Baoris farri (Moore, 1878)

Genus Baracus—hedge hoppers
 Hedge hopper or Hampson's hedge-hopper, Baracus vittatus (Felder, 1862)

Genus Pseudoborbo—Bevan's swift
 Beavan's swift, Pseudoborbo bevani (Moore, 1878) ?

Genus Borbo—swifts
 Rice swift, Borbo cinnara (Wallace, 1866)

Genus Caltoris—swifts
 Kanara swift, Caltoris canaraica (Moore, 1883)
 Blank swift, Caltoris kumara (Moore, 1878)
 Philippine swift, Caltoris philippina (Herrich-Schäffer, 1869)

Genus Cupitha—wax dart
 Wax dart, Cupitha purreea (Moore, 1877)

Genus Erionota—palm redeye
 Palm redeye, Erionota thrax (Linnaeus, 1767)

Genus Gangara—giant redeye

 Giant redeye, Gangara thyrsis (Fabricius, 1775)

Genus Gegenes
 Dingy swift, Gegenes nostrodamus (Fabricius, 1793)

Genus Halpe—aces
 Indian ace or Ceylon ace, Halpe homolea (Hewitson, 1868)
 Moore's ace, Halpe porus (Mabille, 1876)
 Chestnut bob, Iambrix salsala (Moore, 1865)

Genus Matapa—branded redeye
 Common redeye, Matapa aria (Moore, 1865)

Genus Notocrypta—demons

 Restricted demon, Notocrypta curvifascia (Felder & Felder, 1862)
 Common banded demon, Notocrypta paralysos (Wood-Mason & de Nicéville, 1881)

Genus Parnara 
 African straight or straight swift, Parnara naso (Fabricius, 1798)
 Continental swift, Parnara ganga (Evans, 1937)

Genus Pelopidas—branded swifts
 Dark branded swift, Pelopidas agna (Moore, 1865)
 Great swift, Pelopidas assamensis (De Nicéville, 1882)
 Conjoined swift, Pelopidas conjuncta (Herrich-Schäffer, 1869)
 Dark small-branded swift, Pelopidas mathias (Fabricius, 1798)
 Large branded swift, Pelopidas subochracea (Moore, 1878)
 Pale small-branded swift, Pelopidas thrax (Hübner, 1821)

Genus Polytremis 
 Contiguous swift, Polytremis lubricans (Herrich-Schäffer, 1869)

Genus Potanthus—darts
 Confucian dart or Chinese dart, Potanthus confucius (Felder & Felder, 1862)
 Pallied dart, Potanthus pallida (Evans, 1932)
 Palni dart, Potanthus palnia (Evans, 1914)
 Pava dart, Potanthus pava (Fruhstorfer, 1911)
 Pseudomaesa or common dart, Potanthus pseudomaesa (Moore, 1881)

Genus Psolos—coon
 Coon, Psolos fuligo (Mabille, 1876)

Genus Quedara
 Yellow-base flitter or golden tree flitter, Quedara basiflava (De Nicéville, 1888)

Genus Salanoemia—lancer
 Maculate lancer, Salanoemia sala (Hewitson, 1866)

Genus Sovia
 Bicolour ace, Sovia hyrtacus (De Nicéville, 1897)

Genus Suastus—palm bob
 Indian palm bob, Suastus gremius (fabricius, 1798)
 Small palm bob, Suastus minuta (Moore, 1877)

Genus Taractrocera—grass darts
 Tamil grass dart, Taractrocera ceramas (Hewitson, 1868)
 Common grass dart, Taractrocera maevius (Fabricius, 1793)

Genus Telicota—palm darts
 Dark palm dart, Telicota ancilla (Herrich-Schäffer, 1869)
 Pale palm dart, Telicota colon (Fabricius, 1775)

Genus Cephrenes
 Plain palm dart, Cephrenes chrysozona (Plötz, 1883)

Genus Thoressa—aces
 Southern spotted ace or unbranded ace Thoressa astigmata (Swinhoe, 1890)
 Evershed's ace, Thoressa evershedi (Evans, 1910)
 Madras ace, Thoressa honorei (De Nicéville, 1887)
 Tamil ace or Sitala ace Thoressa sitala (De Nicéville, 1885)

Genus Udaspes—grass demon

 Grass demon, Udaspes folus (Cramer, 1775)

Genus Hyarotis—flitters
 Tree flitter, Hyarotis adrastus (Stoll, 1782)
 Brush flitter, Hyarotis microstrictum (Wood-Mason & de Nicéville, 1887)

Genus Oriens—dartlets
 Tamil dartlet, Oriens concinna (Elwes & Edwards, 1897)
 Common dartlet, Oriens goloides (Moore, 1881)

Subfamily Pyrginae

Genus Caprona —angles
 Golden angle, Caprona ransonnetti (Felder, 1868)
 Spotted angle, Caprona agama (Moore, 1857 )
 Spotted angle, Caprona alida (De Nicéville, 1891)

Genus Celaenorrhinus—flat
 Malabar spotted flat, Celaenorrhinus ambareesa (Moore, 1865)
 Common spotted flat, Celaenorrhinus leucocera (Kollar, 1848)
 Tamil spotted flat, Celaenorrhinus ruficornis (Mabille, 1878)

Genus Coladenia—pied flats
 Fulvous pied flat, Coladenia dan (Fabricius, 1787)
 Tricolour flat, Coladenia indrani (Moore, 1865)

Genus Gerosis—white flat
 Common yellowbreasted flat, Gerosis bhagava (Moore, 1865) ?

Genus Gomalia
 African mallow skipper or marbled skipper, Gomalia elma (Trimen, 1862)

Genus Odontoptilum—angles
 Chestnut angle or banded angle, Odontoptilum angulata (Felder, 1862)

Genus Sarangesa—small flats
 Common small flat, Sarangesa dasahara (Moore, 1865)
 Spotted small flat, Sarangesa purendra (Moore, 1882)

Genus Spialia —grizzled skippers
 Indian grizzled skipper or Indian skipper, Spialia galba (Fabricius, 1793)

Genus Tagiades—snow flats

 Immaculate/large/suffused snow flat, Tagiades gana (Moore, 1865)
 Common/Ceylon snow flat, Tagiades jepetus (Stoll, 1782)
 Water snow flat, Tagiades litigiosa (Möschler, 1878)

Genus Tapena—angles
 Angled flat or black angle, Tapena thwaitesi (Moore, 1881)

See also
 Butterfly
 List of butterflies of India
 Fauna of India
 Flora of India
 List of butterflies of Kerala
 Butterflies of Kerala (in Commons)
 List of butterflies of Tamil Nadu
 List of butterflies of Karnataka

Notes

References
 Kunte, K. (In press.) Checklist of the Butterflies of the Western Ghats, Southwestern India. In K. A. Subramanian (ed.) Diversity and Conservation of Invertebrates in the Western Ghats. 

 
 Larsen, T. B. 1987–88. The butterflies of the Nilgiri Mountains of southern India (Lepidoptera: Rhopalocera) Journal of the Bombay Natural History Society, vol 84 & 85.

External links
 ButterflyIndia email discussion group
 Western Ghats list

Western Ghats
'
'